Badlands are a type of terrain with clay-rich soil, and are found in regions with arid climate.

Badlands, Bad lands or Badland may also refer to:

Places

Canada 
 Municipal District of Badlands No. 7, Alberta, a former municipal district

United States
 Philadelphia Badlands, a section of North Philadelphia, Pennsylvania
 Badlands National Park, South Dakota
 Badlands Observatory, an astronomical observatory named after the South Dakota Badlands
 Badlands Wilderness, a wilderness area located entirely within the national park
 The Badlands (California), a mountain range

Arts and entertainment

Films
In the Badlands, 1909 film with Hobart Bosworth, Betty Hartem and Tom Santschi
 The Bad Lands, a 1925 film starring Harry Carey
 Bad Lands (1939 film), an American western film starring Robert Barrat
 Badlands (film), a 1973 Terrence Malick film
 Into the Badlands (film), 1991 Western horror film
 Badland (2007 film), an American drama film starring Jamie Draven and Vinessa Shaw
 Bad Land: The Road to Fury, UK released title of the 2014 film Young Ones
 Badland (2019 film), an American western film starring Kevin Makely

Music

Bands
 Badlands (band), an American hard rock band formed by Jake E. Lee
 Badlands, a British band formed by John Sloman

Albums
 Badlands (Badlands album), a 1989 album by the band of the same name
 Badlands (Dirty Beaches album), a 2011 album by Dirty Beaches
 Badlands (Peter Erskine), a 2001 album
 Badlands (Halsey album), a 2015 album by Halsey
 Badlands, a 1978 album and song by Bill Chinnock
 Badlands, a 2013 album and song by Trampled Under Foot

EPs
 Badlands (EP), a 2013 EP by Australian group Bad Dreems

Songs
 "Badlands" (Bruce Springsteen song), a Bruce Springsteen song from the 1978 album Darkness on the Edge of Town
 "Badlands", a song by AC/DC from Flick of the Switch
 "Badlands", a song by Metal Church from Blessing in Disguise
 "Bad Lands", a song by Zion I & The Grouch from Heroes in the City of Dope

Other
 Badlands (Swedish musical act), a Swedish semi-electronic music project formed by producer Catharina Jaunviksna

Publications
Bad Land: An American Romance, a 1996 travelogue by Jonathan Raban
Badlands, a comic book mini-series by Steven Grant
Badlands, a 1975 novel by Robert Kroetsch about the Red Deer Valley of southern Alberta

Television
 "Badlands", an episode of Jewel Riders
 "Badlands", an episode of Generator Rex
 Into the Badlands (TV series)

Video games
 Badland (video game), released in 2013
Badland 2, a sequel of the mobile game
 Badlands (1984 video game), a 1984 laserdisc video game by Konami
 Badlands (video game), a 1989 arcade game published by Atari Games
 Badlands, a playable map in Team Fortress 2
 Badlands, a zone in World of Warcraft

Other
 Badlands (Star Trek), a location in the fictional Star Trek universe
 The Badlands, one of the six sectors of Mars in Red Faction: Guerrilla

People
 Annette Badland (born 1950), English actress
 Badlands Booker (born 1969), American hip hop artist and competitive eater

Other uses
 Operation Badlands, part of the Iraq War that began in 2003
 Battle of the Badlands, fought in Dakota Territory in 1864 between the US Army and several Native American tribes
 Badlands Motor Speedway, a dirt track racing complex in Brandon, South Dakota
Badlands (San Francisco), a former gay bar in San Francisco's Castro District
 Badlands brand fishing and hunting gear, made by the W. C. Bradley Co. subsidiary Zebco Brands